Bodufinolhu as a place name may refer to:
 Bodufinolhu (Alif Dhaal Atoll) (Republic of Maldives)
 Bodufinolhu (Baa Atoll) (Republic of Maldives)
 Bodufinolhu (Kaafu Atoll) (Republic of Maldives)
 Bodufinolhu (Laamu Atoll) (Republic of Maldives)
 Bodufinolhu (Thaa Atoll) (Republic of Maldives)